Robert Nathan "Rob" Fried is an American film producer, screenwriter, studio executive and media entrepreneur. He is the founder of Fried Films and Spiritclips, LLC, a division of Hallmark Cards which includes Hallmark eCards and Feeln. He previously served as president and CEO of Savoy Pictures, executive vice president of production for Columbia Pictures, director of film finance and special projects for Columbia Pictures and director of business development at 20th Century Fox. He became the CEO of ChromaDex in 2018.

Career
From 1983 to 1990, Fried held various executive positions. He served as executive vice president of production for Columbia Pictures, during the days when Dawn Steel was served as president of Columbia Pictures in 1987, director of film finance and special projects for Columbia Pictures and director of business development at 20th Century Fox. Orion Pictures hired Fried as vice president of production in 1986. He founded Fried Films, a production company, in 1990 and served as founding CEO. Fried won an Academy Award in 1992 for his short film, Session Man. His film Rudy won the Christopher Award that year.

He was president and CEO of Savoy Pictures from December 1994 to June 1996. In 1996, Fried founded WhatsHotNow, an e-commerce company that sells entertainment memorabilia. He was chairman and CEO of the company until June 2001. In 2005, Collateral, a movie Fried produced, won an ASCAP award. Fried launched Spirit EMX, an internet video content company, in 2007. Hallmark Cards acquired Spirit EMX and rebranded it as SpiritClips, LLC. He serves as CEO of the company. Fried served as co-chairman of Tiger Media from October 2009 to August 2011. In 2018, he was named CEO of ChromaDex.

Personal life
Fried holds a Bachelor of Science degree from Cornell University and a Master of Business Administration degree from the Columbia University Graduate School of Business.

In 1994, he married actress Nancy Travis, who appeared in Fried's So I Married An Axe Murderer (1993). They have two sons.

Filmography

References

External links

Spiritclips.com

American film producers
American film studio executives
American male screenwriters
Columbia Business School alumni
Cornell University alumni
Living people
Place of birth missing (living people)
Year of birth missing (living people)
Directors of Live Action Short Film Academy Award winners
American chief executives